Reza G. Hamzaee (Persian: رضا حمزه‌ای) (born 7 May 1951) is an Iranian-American economist and BOG-Distinguished Professor of Economics at Missouri Western State University. He is known for his research on banking and managerial economics.

Notes

External links
Hamzaee at MWSU
Hamzaee's CV
 

Living people
Iranian economists
Iranian educators
Iranian male writers
American people of Iranian descent
Missouri Western State University faculty
Arizona State University alumni
1951 births
University of California, Santa Barbara alumni
Shahid Beheshti University alumni